Christian Alberto Vilches González (born 13 July 1983), known as Christian Vilches, is a Chilean professional footballer who plays as a central defender for Unión La Calera.

Club career

Palestino
Vilches began his career at Deportes Quilicura, a humble club of his country's third division. In 2004 he signed with Palestino, a club of the professional first division. He made his professional debut against Unión San Felipe and scored his first goal in the professional football against Cobresal in a 3–3 draw.

In 2005, the player was loaned to Unión La Calera, where he remained until June of the following year before returning to the Colony Club. After a nondescript year in 2007, in the following season Vilches was part of his club's historic season, in which the team advanced to the 2008 Clausura final.

Audax Italiano
After his successful participation with Palestino, it was reported that Colo-Colo, one of the Big Three of Chilean football, was interested in him, but he finally joined Audax Italiano. The player scored 2 goals in 39 matches during the season, being a key player in the team's scheme. In the following season, after an irregular tournament start, Vilches had a good season with The Italians, being a starter in every match, and was nominated in the Chilean team of the year. He played a total of 36 games and scored 2 goals during the season.

Colo-Colo

After several rumors of Vilches' incorporation to Colo-Colo, his signing was confirmed, and he was introduced as club's new player on 23 June 2011.

Notes

External links
 
 

1983 births
Living people
Footballers from Santiago
Chilean footballers
Chile international footballers
Chilean expatriate footballers
Deportes Quilicura footballers
Unión La Calera footballers
Audax Italiano footballers
Club Deportivo Palestino footballers
Colo-Colo footballers
Club Athletico Paranaense players
Universidad de Chile footballers
Primera B de Chile players
Chilean Primera División players
Campeonato Brasileiro Série A players
Chilean expatriate sportspeople in Brazil
Expatriate footballers in Brazil
Association football central defenders